Schönbrunn Zoo (also simply called Vienna Zoo) is a 17-hectare (42-acre) zoo in the city of Vienna, Austria. Established in 1752, it is the world’s oldest zoo still in operation. It is also a UNESCO World Heritage Site, being a part of the Schönbrunn Palace gardens. It generally receives more than 2 million visitors every year.

As of 2021, it presented a total of 707 different species with around 8,250 specimens. Its primary attractions include the giant pandas, being one of only 27 zoos in the world to have them.

Anthony Sheridan’s zoo rankings recognised Schönbrunn Zoo as the best zoo in Europe in years 2008, 2010, 2012, 2014, 2018 and 2021. Zoologist Stephan Hering-Hagenbeck has been the zoo’s director since 2019.

History

Founding and early years 
Schönbrunn Zoo was the brainchild of Francis Stephen of Lorraine, the husband of Maria Theresa, the empress of the Habsburg monarchy at the time. In 1745, Francis Stephen commissioned the architect Jean Nicolas Jadot de Ville-Issey to design a menagerie in the park at the Habsburg-Lorraine’s summer residence in Schönbrunn.

Twelve enclosures were created at the park, each with equally sized structures for the animals, and an administration building with a front garden. A pond and two yards were added later. The menagerie was presented to guests after around one year of construction in the summer of 1752. The last section to be completed was the octagonal pavilion at the heart of the site, which was laid out as a breakfast and social room in 1759. It still constitutes the zoo's historical centre to this day. It has been used as a restaurant since 1949.The first elephant arrived at Schönbrunn Zoo in 1770 and wolves and bears were the first predators to arrive in 1781. The first polar bears, big cats, hyenas and kangaroos arrived along with another pair of Asian elephants in around 1800.

The menagerie was initially reserved for the imperial family but schools were subsequently also permitted to visit the zoo along with diplomats and private guests. The menagerie, the palace and the park were later opened to "decently dressed persons" (at first only on Sundays) in 1778. The exotic animals attracted many visitors not only from Vienna and the surrounding areas but also guests from other countries. By that point, the zoo was already opening to visitors on a daily basis and the first detailed descriptions and zoo guides were being written.

In the 19th century 
Schönbrunn Zoo received its first giraffe as a gift from the Viceroy of Egypt in 1828. Its arrival triggered a genuine craze and influenced fashion, handicrafts and social life in Vienna. Clothes, shoes and utensils with giraffe motifs, hairstyles, a perfume, a play and two compositions à la giraffe were created.

The menagerie’s look changed significantly towards the end of the 19th century. Alois Kraus, who headed the zoo from 1879 to early 1919, rearranged the historic grounds to make them more suitable for the animals and easier for the public to visit. Animal enclosures and farm buildings were newly built or modernized and the zoo was extended east and south. Schönbrunn Zoo had already come to be regarded as one of the most beautiful zoos in the world by the beginning of the 20th century.

In 1906, the first elephant to be conceived in a zoological garden was born at Schönbrunn.

The complex remained private property of the imperial family until the end of the Austro-Hungarian empire.

World Wars and the 20th century 
Only 400 animals survived World War I due to supply shortages and associated hygiene problems. The zoo was only able to survive as a result of the residents of Vienna organising a relief campaign and making donations of animals and materials.

Otto Antonius, who headed Schönbrunn Zoo from 1924 to 1945, was the first director who was a biologist. His tenure saw the number of animals at the zoo increasing to more than 3,000 by 1930. He also introduced the idea of breeding endangered species for conservation. He involved himself in raising awareness among the general public, promoted nature conservation and intensified the increasingly important contacts to the media, universities and museums. The term ‘menagerie’ was officially replaced with the term ‘zoo’ in 1926.

The zoo had suffered aerial bombing attacks at the end of World War II that destroyed and damaged many of the animal enclosures and more than one thousand animals died. The Soviet and later the British occupation forces helped with the reconstruction following the end of hostilities.

Julius Brachetka, who headed the zoo from 1945 to 1958, revived public interest with entertaining appearances in the media that were frequently accompanied by animals from the zoo. The first posters were created and photography competitions were held. A new aquarium and terrarium building was opened in 1959 to replace the one for the ostriches and reptiles that had been damaged during the bombing.

Walter Fiedler, who headed the zoo from 1967 to 1987, doubled the zoo’s original area to 12 hectares with the conversion of the former Kleinen Fasangarten (Little Pheasant Garden) to the east. Other milestones included the opening of a children’s zoo in 1969 and the establishment of an education department at the zoo in 1976, one of the first in Europe.

Criticism of outmoded animal husbandry reached its peak in the late 1980s. Discussions about the dissolution of the zoo or a relocation to another district in Vienna ended in 1991. The zoo was subsequently spun off from administration by the federal government as Schönbrunner Tiergarten-Ges.m.b.H. – but the Republic of Austria remained the sole shareholder. Veterinarian Helmut Pechlaner who had been the director at the Alpenzoo Innsbruck, was appointed the managing director.

With the support of the Republic of Austria, numerous donors and sponsors as well as new admission fees, Helmut Pechlaner was able to modernise and expand many of the enclosures. The first construction project to be completed was the small monkey house in 1992 with two ‘monkey islands’ in the baroque pond as an outdoor enclosure that is now home to ring-tailed lemurs and gibbons. The zoo was extended to the south with a section from the Vienna Woods. The Tirolerhof (Tyrolean Farmyard), a new elephant park, the modern big cat enclosure, an enclosure for giant pandas, an insectarium and one of the largest rhino enclosures in Europe were created. The two Indian rhinos that arrived in 2006 were a gift from the former royal family of Nepal. The animals had been picked up as orphans and it had not been possible to reintegrate them into the wild. 

The ensemble of Schönbrunn Palace, Zoo and Palace Park was declared a UNESCO World Heritage Site in 1996. The same year saw the unveiling of the first large bronze sculpture by Gottfried Kumpf, a lion. More bronze sculptures that remain a popular photo motif to this day were added over the following decades. The Rainforest House was opened to celebrate the zoo’s 250th anniversary in 2002, which was also the year in which the first koalas arrived at Schönbrunn and the panorama railway experience was opened.

Recent years 
Dagmar Schratter succeeded Helmut Pechlaner on 1 January 2007 and filled the position of the zoo’s sole managing director until the end of 2019. Her tenure stood out for five awards that recognised the zoo as the best in Europe, five giant panda cubs and the record year of 2008 during which the zoo recorded a total of 2.6 million visitors. Stephan Hering-Hagenbeck, who previously worked at Tierpark Hagenbeck (Hagenbeck Zoo) in Hamburg, was introduced as her successor in autumn 2019. He assumed the role in January 2020.

Giant pandas 

Schönbrunn Zoo is one of few zoos in Europe that is able to boast giant pandas as an attraction. The female Yang Yang (阳阳 ‘Sunshine’) and the male Long Hui (龙辉 ‘Sign of the Dragon’) arrived in 2003 and are known for successful breeding.

Yang Yang gave birth to the first baby panda (a male) to be conceived naturally and not by artificial insemination in Europe on 23 August 2007. In accordance with traditions in China, it was named 100 days after its birth: Fu Long (福龙, ‘Happy Dragon’). The second baby panda, also a male, was born at Schönbrunn exactly three years after Fu Long's birth on 23 August 2010. It was named Fu Hu (福虎, ‘Happy Tiger’). A third panda cub, another male, was born on 14 August 2013. It was named Fu Bao (福豹), which means ‘Happy Leopard’. These animals were followed by twins, which were born on 7 August 2016, and named Fu Feng (福凤 ‘Happy Phoenix’) and Fu Ban (福伴 ‘Happy Companion’). Yang Yang was the first panda in captivity to raise twins without the help of her keepers.

The cubs were transferred to China to zoos or panda breeding stations at the age of two. 
Long Hui passed away in December 2016 as a result of a tumour. A new male panda, Yuan Yuan, arrived at the zoo in April 2019.

Exhibits

"Worlds of Experience"

Franz Josef Land 
The five-metre-deep plunge pool at the World of Polar Bears, which opened in 2014, allows visitors to see polar bears swimming underwater. The facility is 1,700 square metres large. The name is a tribute to the successful expedition to the Arctic achieved by Austria-Hungary in the past. The visitor centre, known as the Polar Dome, has been designated an ‘Arctic Ambassador Centre’ by Polar Bears International.

Polarium 

The glazed 13 metres of pool permits visitors to watch South American sea lions swimming. At feeding time, the animals climb on to the rocks and jump into the water to catch the fish as they are thrown into the water.

The seasonal light and climate conditions of native habitats are simulated for king penguins and northern rockhopper penguins: around 10 °C room temperature and 8 °C water temperature.

Rainforest House 
The Rainforest House was opened in the year of the zoo’s 250th anniversary. The Glass House presents a section of a mountain slope in a rainforest in south-east Asia. This is where, among others, the rare northern river terrapin, Asian small-clawed otters, various species of birds, flying foxes and Fiji banded iguanas live. Sophisticated environmental systems ensure that temperatures don’t fall below a minimum of 25 °C and that the humidity doesn’t fall below 80% at any time of the year.

ORANG.erie 
The first Palm House, which was built in the 19th century under Emperor Franz I and used as a film studio from 1920, was revitalised in 2009 and has been home to the orangutans since then. Reproductions of the works by Nonja, a female orangutan, are on display at ‘Atelier Nonja’, the adjacent café-restaurant. Nonja is famous for the paintings she produced with the paints and brushes she was presented with to occupy her in the 1990s.

Insectarium 
The house was opened in 2005 and presents insects that are masters of camouflage and deception in 14 terrariums.

Aquarium and Terrarium House 
This building is entered through the crocodile pavilion. Species kept in the aquarium include piranhas, lionfish, moray eels and rays as well as a large coral reef with hundreds of fish from the Indo-Pacific. The Schönbrunn Zoo is home to the most species of jellyfish in the world. A tunnel aquarium with arapaimas takes visitors into the terrarium building where snakes, iguanas, Aldabra giant tortoises and other reptules live.

Pet Park 
The Pet Park keeps small domestic animals that visitors are allowed to interact with.

Nature Discovery Trail 
The treetop path leads from the zoo’s Tirolerhof (Tyrolean farmyard) up 10 metres into the tree canopy to enable visitors to observe the native species of birds. The forest path continues past outdoor terrariums with native reptiles and amphibians. The world of native fish is presented in large aquariums in the ‘Am Wasser’ (At the Waterside) section.

South America Park 
Giant anteaters, capybaras, Brazilian tapirs, vicuñas and greater rhea live together in the South America Park. The outdoor area has been laid out to resemble a pampas landscape with hills and ponds.

Tirolerhof (Tyrolean Farmyard) 

The Haidachhof, a two-storey Lower Inn Valley single-structure farm that dates back to 1722, is a listed building that was dismantled at its original location in Brandenberg in Tyrol and rebuilt at the zoo. Endangered breeds of farm animals such as Tux-Zillertal, Pustertaler Sprinzen, Noriker horses, Carinthian sheep, Original Braunvieh, Tauernsheck goats and Sulmtaler chickens have been kept here in the stables since then.

Big Cat House 
The Big Cat House leads to the indoor enclosures where Amur leopards and Siberian tigers live. Each species is able to enjoy a large landscaped outdoor area adjacent to the building that features raised platforms, ponds and shrubs for concealment. The cheetah enclosure is often cited as an example of Helmut Pechlaner’s ingenuity. He had the asphalted visitor area converted into an outdoor landscape in 1994 that allowed visitors to observe the animals from the old cages.

Birdhouse 
Two open-air halls each present different landscapes and their native wildlife: the African savannah and the South American tropics with dozens of birds in a lush jungle of plants. The central hall is home to the zoo's Linnaeus's two-toed sloths.

Rat House 
The Rat House is home to fancy rats, Gambian pouched rats and Northern Luzon giant cloud rats. Special lighting technology has been installed to adapt the rhythms of the day and night so that visitors may observe the nocturnal rodents climbing, bathing and burrowing.

Monkey House 
The historic building, which dates back to 1841, underwent a general renovation in 2012 after two previous conversions (1906, 1930) and is home to king colobus, meerkats, red ruffed lemurs, pygmy marmosets, common squirrel monkeys, emperor tamarins, and Goeldi's marmosets.

Rhino Park 
Two Indian rhinos live on 6,000 square metres along with such other Asian species as nilgais, indochinese sika deer and blackbucks.

Giraffe Park 

The historic Giraffe House was restored in 2017. A winter garden was added in accordance with conservation requirements to the rear of the building for the purposes of providing more space for the giraffes during the winter months. The photovoltaic system that has been incorporated into the glass roof produces all the electricity that the enclosure requires. A layer of gravel in the basement converts the heat that accumulates during the day into night-time heating. The zoo was awarded the City of Vienna’s environmental prize for the utilisation of these technologies.

East Africa House 
The East Africa House is home to smaller species of animals from the same habitat that is occupied by the giraffes like common dwarf mongooses and Von der Decken's hornbills, which forage together in the wild, and southern ground hornbills, which live in the same outdoor enclosure as the giraffes.

Desert House 
The Desert House is located at the zoo’s entrance gates opposite the Palm House. A circuit trail leads through a desert habitat with rattlesnakes, naked mole-rats, colourful birds and other creatures of the desert. The botanical focus is on the cacti and other succulents.

Wildlife conservation and research 
Schönbrunn Zoo participates in international breeding programmes for the purposes of wildlife conservation. It is responsible here within the scope of the EAZA Ex-situ Programme for maintaining the studbook for the southern and northern rockhopper penguins as well as the Fiji banded iguana.

Giant pandas – wildlife conservation project 
Schönbrunn Zoo cooperates with the China Wildlife Conservation Association (CWCA) in its efforts to protect giant pandas. Joint research activities, conservation breeding, regular training courses, the establishment of panda reserves and the reforestation of bamboo forests are regarded as some of the most important pillars of the project.

Northern bald ibis – wildlife conservation project 

Schönbrunn Zoo is a partner to the team that is working within a European Life+ project to reintroduce the northern bald ibis, which is a highly endangered species, to central Europe. These birds’ chicks that are hatched in zoos and wildlife parks are imprinted on human foster parents, who then use ultralight aircraft to teach the birds how to navigate to suitable overwintering quarters.

Northern river terrapin – wildlife conservation project 
Northern river terrapins belong to the three rarest species of turtle in the world. Schönbrunn Zoo was the first to successfully breed these terrapins in captivity in 2010. The zoo has – in addition to its important breeding efforts – also initiated a rescue mission in Bangladesh.

Polar bears – wildlife conservation project 

The zoo supports ‘Polar Bears International’ (PBI), an initiative to save polar bears. The PBI researches how polar bears live in their native habitats. Transmitters are fitted to animals in the wild to track their migratory routes, which have changed due to the disappearing pack ice.

Barbary apes – wildlife conservation project 
The zoo also supports the Barbary Macaque Awareness and Conservation (BMAC) wildlife conservation project in Morocco, which, among other things, runs educational programmes and is working to reintroduce illegally captured Barbary macaques to the wild.

Brasilian tapirs – wildlife conservation project 
As part of a research project in the Pantanal in South America, collar transmitters provide information about what tapirs need to survive. The project also keeps local residents informed about the animal world.

Pond turtles – wildlife conservation project 
European pond turtles are the only species of turtle that is native to Austria. The zoo is working with the Donau-Auen National Park, where the last intact population in Austria lives, to protect the clutches.

Bearded vultures – wildlife conservation project 
Bearded vultures were wiped out at the beginning of the 20th century. Animals have been successfully reintroduced from breeding programmes such as those that have taken place at Schönbrunn Zoo since the 1980s.

Ural owl – wildlife conservation project 
Habitat loss resulted in the extinction of the Ural owl in Austria. Living conditions have improved again and so a decision was made to launch a reintroduction project, which Schönbrunn Zoo is supporting with, among other things, chicks from its breeding programmes. Several hundred birds have already been released into the wild.

Zoological, historical and veterinary research is also carried out at the zoo – mainly in cooperation with the University of Veterinary Medicine Vienna and the Department of Evolutionary Biology of the Faculty of Life Sciences at the University of Vienna.

Significant breeding successes 
The five Giant Panda cubs were the first in Europe to be born as a result of natural conception. Yang Yang was the world’s first panda in captivity to raise twins without help from her keepers.

A female anteater was also able to successfully raise her twins for the first time in the world at a zoo in 2000.

The first elephant calf to be conceived with the help of artificial insemination using frozen semen was born at the zoo in 2013.

Schönbrunn Zoo is the only zoo in Europe to successfully breed the endangered northern rockhopper penguins every year.

First conservation breeding successes in the world

 2010 Northern river terrapin (Batagur baska)
 2011 Bornean rock frog species Staurois guttatus and Staurois parvus
 2012 South American snapping turtle (Chelydra acutirostris)
 2015 Gigant jellyfish (Rhizostoma luteum)
 2015 Green keel-bellied lizard (Gastropholis prasina)
 2016 Broadley’s flat lizard (Platysaurus broadleyi)

Company data 

Zoologist Stephan Hering-Hagenbeck has been the zoo’s sole managing director since 1 January 2020, Ana Haschka is the company officer with statutory authority. The members of the Supervisory Board are Wolfgang Schüssel, Elke Koch, Monika Geppl, Alexander Palma, Alexander Keller and Thomas Sedlak. Schönbrunner Tiergarten-Gesellschaft m.b.H. is a shareholder in Tiergarten Schönbrunn Gastronomie GmbH and a limited partner in Dipl. Tzt. Thomas Voracek KG Tierärztliche Ordination Tiergarten Schönbrunn.

Schönbrunner Tiergarten-Gesellschaft m.b.H. has been registered in the commercial register under the number 47954x since 30 December 1991, the capital contribution amounts to €600,000.00 and is solely owned by the Republic of Austria, represented by the Federal Ministry for Digital and Economic Affairs.The company further operates the Desert House at the gates of the zoo in conjunction with the Österreichische Bundesgärten (Austrian Federal Gardens) in the form of the ‘ARGE Sonnenuhrhaus’ (‘Joint Venture Sundial House’).

The zoo has been certified by TÜV Süd since 2015 in accordance with international standards ISO 9001 (quality management), ISO 14001 (environmental management) and ISO 45001 (occupational health and safety).

Literature 

 Mitchell G. Ash, Lothar Dittrich (Hrsg.): Menagerie des Kaisers. Zoo der Wiener. Pichler, Wien 2002, .
 Gerhard Heindl: Start in die Moderne. Die kaiserliche Menagerie unter Alois Kraus. Braumüller, Wien 2006, .
 Gerhard Kunze: Tiergarten Schönbrunn. Zoo der glücklichen Tiere. Österreichs magischer Kraftort. Holzhausen, Wien 2005, .
 Gerhard Kunze: Tiergarten Schönbrunn: von der Menagerie des Kaisers zu Helmut Pechlaners Zoo der glücklichen Tiere. LW Werbe- und Verlagsgesellschaft, Wien 2001, .
 E. Minoggio: Mit Kinderaugen Tiere sehen. Ein Kinder-Zooführer durch den Tiergarten Schönbrunn. Manz, Wien 2004, .
 Sigrid Laube, Maria Blazejovsky: Zoogeschichten. Jungbrunnen, Wien 2002, .
 Oliver E. Paget: Tierisch heiter. Ein historisch-kulturell-tierischer Rundgang. Stangl, Wien 2002, .
 Helmut Pechlaner, Gaby V. Schwammer: Zooführer. Schönbrunner Tiergarten, Wien 2006, .
 Helmut Pechlaner, Dagmar Schratter, Gerhard Heindl (Hrsg.): Tiergarten Schönbrunn. Geschichte. Braumüller, Wien 2005, ISSN 1994-5116
 Helmut Pechlaner: Meine Schönbrunner Tiergeschichten. Holzhausen, Wien 1997, .
 Christa Riedl-Dorn: Hohes Tier. Die Geschichte der ersten Giraffe in Schönbrunn. Braumüller, Wien 2008, .
 Dagmar Schratter (Herausgeberin), Gerhard Heindl: Tiere unterwegs. Historisches und Aktuelles über Tiererwerb und Tiertransporte. Braumüller, Wien 2007, .
 Dagmar Schratter, Regina Pfistermüller, Petra Stefan: Der Koala: Koalas in Schönbrunn – Austria hilft Australien. Schönbrunner Tiergarten, Wien 2002, .
 Gaby Schwammer, Hanno Fürnwein: Die Botschaft der Regenwälder. Schönbrunner Tiergarten, Wien 2002, .
 Daniel Zupanc, Regina Pfistermüller: Wildnis Zoo. Impressionen aus Schönbrunn. KIKO Verlag, Wien 2008, .
 Gabriele Pechlaner, Helmut Pechlaner: Das Wunderwerk Zoo. 24 Stunden im Tiergarten Schönbrunn. Holzhausen Verlag, Wien 2001, .
 Gaby Schwammer, Harald Schwammer: Im Einsatz für gefährdete Arten. Vom Tiergarten Schönbrunn um die ganze Welt. Leopold Stocker Verlag, Graz 2018, .
 Johanna Bukovsky, Daniel Zupanc: Erlebnis Zoo. Begegnungen im Tiergarten Schönbrunn, KIKO Verlag, Wien 2018, .
 Johanna Bukovsky, Daniel Zupanc: Pandas. Eine Erfolgsgeschichte aus dem Tiergarten Schönbrunn, KIKO Verlag, Wien 2018, .

References

External links

  
Tiergarten Schoenbrunn on zooinstitutes.com

Zoos in Austria
Buildings and structures in Hietzing
Tourist attractions in Vienna
Schönbrunn Palace
Zoos established in 1752
1752 establishments in Austria